Government Teachers' Training College, Dhaka is a public college for training government teachers in Dhaka, Bangladesh.

It offers four-year (eight-semester) integrated Bachelor of Education, one-year professional Bachelor of Education (B.Ed) and Master of Education (M.Ed). Some teaching-learning related training programs by different projects are run in the college.

It is situated at the heart of the city in New Market area.

References

External links 
Official Website

Teacher training colleges in Bangladesh
Universities and colleges in Dhaka
1909 establishments in India